Thorpe Hesley is a village in the Metropolitan Borough of Rotherham, South Yorkshire, England, lying east of the M1 motorway at junction 35. The village has been included within the boundaries of Rotherham town since 1894, having previously been divided between the townships of Kimberworth and Wentworth. Historically the village was known for coal mining and nail making.  It has an Anglican church, Holy Trinity, built in 1839 chiefly at the cost of Earl Fitzwilliam and the Earl of Effingham.

There is no post office, one petrol station and four public houses. At the 2011 Census, it had a population of 4,427.

Claim to fame
John Wesley spent some time in the village where he preached. He lodged at Barley Hall (now demolished).

In 1975, there was filming in the village for the Walt Disney film Escape from the Dark. The film was re-titled The Littlest Horse Thieves for its release in the USA.

The BBC TV Series Play for Today had a two part story titled The Price of Coal filmed at the colliery on Wentworth Road; this mine has now been closed and the colliery demolished.

Coal mines
Coal has been mined in and around the area of Thorpe Hesley for at least 800 years. Monks from the Cistercian Abbey of Kirkstead, in Lincolnshire, had forges and other property in this part of the country and mined coal and ironstone locally. Thorpe Hesley had the distinction of having three modern-day coal mines. Which were closed in the 1970s and 1980s and have been completely demolished. The land surrounding the area of the Barley Hall site has been landscaped and is now a small nature reserve.

In January 2013 permission was given for the Hesley Wood colliery spoil heap to be processed to recover fuel, and to restore woodland on the site.

See also
Listed buildings in Rotherham (Keppel Ward)

References

External links

 Thorpe Hesley Village website
 

Geography of the Metropolitan Borough of Rotherham
Villages in South Yorkshire